Inquisition Symphony is the second studio album by the Finnish metal band Apocalyptica. The album branches from their previous effort, containing only four Metallica covers. The remainder of the compositions are by Faith No More, Pantera, and Sepultura, as well as three originals by Apocalyptica bandleader Eicca Toppinen. In this album, some songs add percussive beats on the cellos. Max Lilja did the arrangements for "One". A sequel to "Toreador" appeared on the album Reflections.

Track listing
All arrangements by Eicca Toppinen, except for "One" by Max Lilja

Personnel

Apocalyptica
Eicca Toppinen – cello, arrangement, composer
Paavo Lötjönen – cello
Antero Manninen – cello
Max Lilja – cello, arrangement

References

External links 
 Official artist website
 Official Mercury Records website
 Official Universal Music website

1998 albums
Instrumental albums
Covers albums
Apocalyptica albums